KPCR may refer to:

 KPCR-LP, a low-power radio station (101.9 FM) licensed to serve Santa Cruz, California, United States
 KPCR (FM), a defunct radio station (99.3 FM) formerly licensed to serve Fowler, Colorado, United States
 Real-time polymerase chain reaction